Durga Lal Shrestha (born July 1935) is a Nepalese poet of Nepal Bhasa and Nepali. He was conferred with the title of Janakavi (lit. people's poet) by Nepal Bhasha Parishad in 2003. He is considered as a progressive litterateur. He was awarded the Jagadamba Shree Puraskar in 2010 for "enriching Nepalese literature by writing very melodious songs, poems, poetry and children's literature in his mother tongue (Nepal Bhasa) and Nepali language for the last six decades."

Biography 
Shrestha was born in a lower–middle class Newar family in 1935 (1992 BS) in the Nepalese capital city of Kathmandu to mother Asha Moti Shrestha and father Ganesh Lal Shrestha. He received his school level education from Padmodaya Secondary School.

He started his writing career in around 1949. His first poem titled Dui Thopa (lit. Two Drops) was published in 1952 in Suskera magazine. 

He has on multiple awards including Narottamdas-Indira Award, Abhiyan Award, Noor-Ganga Award, Rashtriya Balsahitya Award, JAA Best Playwrights Medal (1991), Harihar Shastri–Savitri Devi Literary Award (2006) etc. He was also appointed as a Honorary Member of Nepal Academy in 1995.

Notable works

Published works 
His famous published work are:
Pija (1967)
Ji Swayambhu Twath (1986)
Yaka Phalecha (1987)
Inquilabya Palasa (1991)
Twists and Turns
A Pick of Durga Lal Shrestha's poems (2000)
Chiniyamha Kisicha (1965)
Taibhaba (1966)
Chiniya Champa (1967)
Kulikasa (1967)
Salachhyonya Bela (1969)
Machabakhancha (1995)
Santaya Kusa (2001)
Macha Bakhancha
Tapaka
Jungle Kabita

Songs
Soundtrack for Nepal Bhasa movie Rajamati.
His song "Jhee Masini" ("We Are Not Dead Yet") is considered one of the most powerful songs of the Nepal Bhasa movement.
One of his popular songs is Phool ko Aankhaa Maa, Phoolai Sansara with music by Nhyu Bajracharya and sung by the vocalist Ani Choying Lama. It is included in the album Moments of Bliss, on which all of the songs are written by Shrestha.
He also wrote a few songs for the movie Balidan which dramatized the popular uprising against the Panchayat system and the fight to bring multiparty democracy to Nepal.
He has written a number of songs for new Nepali singer Shweta Punjali, including her debut album Udaan.

References

External links
Layalama - Nepal Bhasa poetry
Official website

Newar
1937 births
Living people
Newar-language writers
Nepalese male writers
Nepali-language writers
Nepali-language poets
Newar-language lyricists
Newar-language poets from Nepal
Jagadamba Shree Puraskar winners